Loretta is the thirty-second solo studio album by American country music singer-songwriter Loretta Lynn. The album was released on March 3, 1980, by MCA Records.

Commercial performance 
The album peaked at No. 24 on the Billboard Top Country Albums chart. The album's first single, "I've Got a Picture of Us on My Mind", peaked at No. 5 on the Billboard Hot Country Songs chart. The second single, "Pregnant Again", peaked at No. 35, and the third single, "Naked in the Rain", peaked at No. 30.

Track listing

Personnel 
Adapted from album liner notes.
Harold Bradley – bass
Owen Bradley – producer
James Caddell – backing vocals
Jerry Carrigan – drums
Gene Chrisman – drums
John Christopher – guitar
Jean Chapman – backing vocals
Ray Edenton – guitar
Buddy Harman – drums
Mike Leech – bass
Hargus "Pig" Robbins – piano
Hal Rugg – steel guitar
Joey Scarbury – backing vocals
Joan Sliwin – backing vocals
Henry Strzelecki – electric bass
Pete Wade – guitar
Bobby Wood – piano
Reggie Young – guitar

Chart positions 
Album – Billboard (North America)

Singles – Billboard (North America)

References 

1980 albums
Loretta Lynn albums
MCA Records albums